Carmina may refer to:

 The Odes (Horace), a collection of Latin poems by Horace
 Carmina (album), a 1984 album by jazz pianist Tete Montoliu
 Carmina Villarroel (born 1975), Filipina actress and TV presenter
 Rosa Carmina (born 1929), Cuban-Mexican actress, dancer and singer
 La Carmina, Canadian blogger and TV host
 Carmiña Londoño Colombian-born American director at the National Science Foundation
 Carmina Virgili (1927–2014), Spanish geologist and politician
 Carmina, main character in Carmina or Blow Up (Carmina o revienta), a 2012 Spanish film

See also

Carlina (name)
 Carmina Burana, a collection of medieval poems and dramatic texts
 Carmina Burana (Orff), cantata based on the medieval works
 Karmina, an American indie pop music